Barry Shear (March 23, 1923 in New York City – June 13, 1979 in Los Angeles) was an American film and television director and producer.

Career

Television career
Shear began directing for television in the 1950s for the DuMont Television Network news program Newsweek Views the News, and directed episodes of the DuMont series Guide Right, Not for Publication, and Joseph Schildkraut Presents. Shear directed The Hazel Scott Show for DuMont, the first television show to feature a Black woman as the star of a show, performing without sketch comedy or guests. He quickly moved to episodic television. Over his 30-year career in television he directed both series and telefilms.  Series that he directed several episodes for include The Man from U.N.C.L.E., The Girl from U.N.C.L.E., The Name of the Game, Ironside, Alias Smith and Jones, Police Story, Police Woman, and The Feather and Father Gang.

Film career
Shear's first made-for-theaters feature was the 1968 counter culture film Wild in the Streets.  He later directed theatrical films in various genres such as The Todd Killings in 1971 (based on the serial killer Charles Schmid), Across 110th Street in 1972, and the western The Deadly Trackers in 1973 (which he overtook from Samuel Fuller).  While well received, these features met with only fair box office and Shear returned to work exclusively in television.

On August 5, 1965, both Shear and Jan Berry, of the singing duo Jan and Dean, were injured along with other film crew members while on the first day on the set of a new Paramount motion picture, Easy Come, Easy Go. Paramount would ultimately cancel the film and reuse the film title the following year for an unrelated film starring Elvis Presley.

Personal life
Shear’s wife was actress Sondra Shear, (1926–2002) and his daughter is director Wendy Shear.

Death
Barry Shear died of cancer at Cedars-Sinai Medical Center in Los Angeles on June 13, 1979, at the age of 56. He was interred at Hollywood Forever Cemetery.

References

External links

1923 births
1979 deaths
20th-century American businesspeople
American film directors
American film producers
American television directors
American television producers
Burials at Hollywood Forever Cemetery
Deaths from cancer in California
University of Wisconsin alumni